Wang Dongning (born April 13, 1961) is a former Chinese international footballer who represented Shandong FC where he played as a defender or midfielder before having short stints at Happy Valley AA, Shenzhen and Qingdao Hainiu. While internationally he represented China in the 1984 Asian Cup and the 1994 Asian Games where he aided the team to a runners-up spot.

Playing career
Wang Dongning started his football career with the Shandong FC youth team before graduating into their senior team in 1982 where he helped guide the club to a runners-up spot at the end of the league season. He was  soon called up to the Chinese national team and was part of the squad that took part in the 1984 Asian Cup where china were beaten in the final to Saudi Arabia. For the next several years he was a loyal player to Shandong, however he was part of the team that saw successive relegation hit the team in 1989 and the 1990 league seasons. Despite this Wang stayed to help the club win promotion back into the second tier before he decided to leave the club and join Hong Kong First Division League team Happy Valley AA. His stay in Hong Kong was brief and Wang  moved back to his old club Shandong in 1994 after they had renamed themselves Shandong Taishan and had returned to the top tier to become a fully professional team. With his return he was also able to gain his way back into the national team and was part of the team that went to the Football at the 1994 Asian Games and helped guide China to a runners-up spot to Uzbekistan. Nearing the end of his career Wang  joined second-tier football club Shenzhen 1995 for a season, where he actually won the division title with them before leaving to join another second-tier club in Shanghai Yuyuan before ending his career with Qingdao Hainiu.

Career statistics

International

Honours
Shandong FC
Chinese Jia-C League: 1991

Shenzhen
Chinese Jia-B League: 1995

References

External links
Team China Stats
Player profile at sodasoccer.com

1961 births
Living people
People from Weihai
Chinese footballers
Footballers from Shandong
China international footballers
Shandong Taishan F.C. players
Happy Valley AA players
Shenzhen F.C. players
Qingdao Hainiu F.C. (1990) players
Asian Games silver medalists for China
Asian Games medalists in football
Association football defenders
Association football midfielders
Medalists at the 1994 Asian Games
Footballers at the 1994 Asian Games